Tangalan Elementary School is a public school in Tangalan, Aklan, Philippines. It is the central school in the district.

Notable people

Alumni and faculty
 Most Rev. Jose Corazon T. Talaoc, D.D. – former Bishop of Romblon (Jun 11, 2003 appointed) ; presently Bishop of Aklan (May 25, 2011 appointed).
 Nanette Sitjar (Master Teacher II) – 2014 Aklan's Ten Outstanding Mentors (ATOM) Awardee

See also
 List of schools in Tangalan
 Education in the Philippines

References

External links
 DepEd Region VI Website
 Data.gov Website
 MOOE for 2014

Schools in Aklan